The governor of Alabama is the head of government of the U.S. state of Alabama. The governor is the head of the executive branch of Alabama's state government and is charged with enforcing state laws.

There have officially been 54 governors of the state of Alabama; this official numbering skips acting and military governors. The first governor, William Wyatt Bibb, served as the only governor of the Alabama Territory. Five people have served as acting governor, bringing the total number of people serving as governor to 59, spread over 63 distinct terms. Four governors have served multiple non-consecutive terms: Bibb Graves, Jim Folsom, and Fob James each served two, and George Wallace served three non-consecutive periods. Officially, these non-consecutive terms are numbered only with the number of their first term. William D. Jelks also served non-consecutive terms, but his first term was in an acting capacity.

The longest-serving governor was George Wallace, who served 16 years over four terms. The shortest term for a non-acting governor was that of Hugh McVay, who served four and a half months after replacing the resigning Clement Comer Clay. Lurleen Wallace, wife of George Wallace, was the first woman to serve as governor of Alabama, and the third woman to serve as governor of any state. The current governor is Republican Kay Ivey, who took office on April 10, 2017 following Robert J. Bentley's resignation amidst a corruption scandal. She is the second female governor of Alabama.

Governors

Governor of the Territory of Alabama
Alabama Territory was formed on March 3, 1817, from Mississippi Territory. It had only one governor appointed by the President of the United States before it became a state; he became the first state governor.

Governors of the State of Alabama

Alabama was admitted to the Union on December 14, 1819. It seceded from the Union on January 11, 1861, and was a founding member of the Confederate States of America on February 4, 1861. Following the end of the American Civil War, Alabama during Reconstruction was part of the Third Military District, which exerted some control over governor appointments and elections. Alabama was readmitted to the Union on July 14, 1868.

The first Alabama Constitution, ratified in 1819, provided that a governor be elected every two years, limited to serve no more than 4 out of every 6 years. This limit remained in place until the constitution of 1868, which simply allowed governors to serve terms of two years. The current constitution of 1901 increased terms to four years, but prohibited governors from succeeding themselves. Amendment 282 to the constitution, passed in 1968, allowed governors to succeed themselves once; a governor serving two consecutive terms can run again after waiting out the next term. The constitution had no set date for the commencement of a governor's term until 1901, when it was set at the first Monday after the second Tuesday in the January following an election. However, the Alabama Supreme Court ruled in 1911 that a governor's term ends at midnight at the end of Monday, and the next governor's term begins the next day, regardless of if they were sworn in on Monday.

The office of lieutenant governor was created in 1868, abolished in 1875, and recreated in 1901. According to the current constitution, should the governor be out of the state for more than 20 days, the lieutenant governor becomes acting governor, and if the office of governor becomes vacant the lieutenant governor ascends to the governorship. Earlier constitutions said the powers of the governor devolved upon the successor, rather than them necessarily becoming governor, but the official listing includes these as full governors. The governor and lieutenant governor are not elected on the same ticket.

Alabama was a strongly Democratic state before the Civil War, electing only candidates from the Democratic-Republican and Democratic parties. It had two Republican governors following Reconstruction, but after the Democratic Party re-established control, 112 years passed before voters chose another Republican.

See also
 List of Alabama state legislatures

Notes

References
General

 
 
 
 

Constitutions

 
 
 
 
 
 

Specific

External links

Office of the Governor of Alabama

Lists of state governors of the United States

Governors
Political history of Alabama